Sdau is a commune (khum) of Rotanak Mondol District in Battambang Province in north-western Cambodia.

Villages

 Banang
 Sdau
 Chamkar Lmut
 Boeng Ampil
 Dangkot
 Doun Meay
 Baribou
 Koak Chhor
 Reak Smey Sangha
 Neang Lem
 Angdoek Dobmouy
 Pich Chanva
 Badak Tboang
 Badak Chhoeung
 Ou Dai Khla
 O Khmum

References

Communes of Battambang province
Rotanak Mondol District